Alexandreion (Greek), or Alexandrium (Latin), called Sartaba in the Mishna and Talmud and Qarn Sartaba in Arabic, was an ancient hilltop fortress constructed by the Hasmoneans between Scythopolis and Jerusalem on a pointy barren hill towering over the Jordan Valley from the west. It was likely named after Hasmonean king Alexander Jannæus (104-77 BCE).

Name
The fortress called "Alexandreion" in Greek, simplified to "Alexandrion" (and Latinised as "Alexandrium"), is mentioned by Josephus in his Antiquities of the Jews. It was mentioned in the Mishna and Talmud as "Sartaba" and is now called "Qarn Sartabe" (lit. "Horn of Sartabe") in Arabic.

History

Alexandrium was constructed by the Hasmoneans near the border with Samaria to accommodate a military garrison, as well as to guard political prisoners. It is later mentioned during Pompey the Great's conquest of Judea as a stronghold of Aristobulus II:  "...as he passed by Pella and Scythopolis, he came to Corem, which is the first entrance into Judea when one passes over the midland countries, where he came to a most beautiful fortress that was built on the top of a mountain called Alexandrium, whither Aristobulus had fled/"

The Alexandreion was restored by Herod the Great, a task he assigned to his brother Pheroras. Herod gave it the character of a palatial desert fortress, similar to those he built or rebuilt at Masada, Herodion and Machaerus. Herod used the fortress as a prison for his political opponents, holding his 2nd wife, Mariamne and her mother, Alexandra there in 30 BCE. It was also the burial site of Alexander, son of Herod, and Aristobulus, two of his sons whom Herod had executed at Sebaste in 7 BCE.

Alexandrium was finally razed by Vespasian or Titus during the Great Revolt.

See also
Hasmonean desert fortresses
Dok (Dagon) on the Mount of Temptation
Hyrcania (fortress)
Cypros (German article)
Machaerus

References

Notes

Bibliography
 Josephus, Flavius. William Whiston, A.M., translator (1895). The Works of Flavius Josephus. Auburn and Buffalo, New York: John E. Beardsley. Retrieved 15 July 2010.

External links

Pictures of Alexandrium-Sartaba

Archaeological sites in the West Bank
National parks of Israel
Sieges involving the Roman Empire